Arbeiterstimme (Worker's Voice) was the central organ of the General Jewish Labour Bund in Lithuania, Poland and Russia. It appeared from 1897 to 1905, as an underground publication. The Bund resumed the publication, now as a legal paper, after the February revolution.

References

Anti-Zionism in Lithuania
Bundism in Europe
Defunct political magazines
Magazines established in 1897
Magazines disestablished in 1905
Yiddish-language mass media in Lithuania
Yiddish-language mass media in Poland
Yiddish-language mass media in Russia